The Bangladeshi cricket team toured Zimbabwe for a two-match Test series and a five-match One Day International (ODI) series between 19 February and 14 March 2004. Zimbabwe won the Test series 1–0 and the ODI series 2–1.

Test series

1st Test

2nd Test

ODI series

1st ODI

2nd ODI

3rd ODI

4th ODI

5th ODI

References

2004 in Bangladeshi cricket
2004 in Zimbabwean cricket
International cricket competitions in 2003–04
2003-04
Zimbabwean cricket seasons from 2000–01